Biel Ballester (born 1974) is a gypsy jazz guitarist from Mallorca, Spain. He contributed music to the Woody Allen film Vicky Cristina Barcelona.

Biography 
Biel Ballester is from Mallorca in Spain. He studied classical guitar under Àlex Garrobé at the Escola D'Arts Musicals Luthier in Barcelona. He discovered the music of Django Reinhardt at age 18, and his music is a fusion of gypsy jazz and Spanish music. With Leo Hipaucha (rhythm guitar) and Oriol González (double bass) he formed the Biel Ballester trio. He was introduced to Woody Allen during the filming of Vicky Cristina Barcelona. Allen, a jazz clarinet player, played frequently with Ballester during this time and included two of his tracks on the soundtrack of the film.

Discography

As leader
 Echoes from Mallorca  (Refined, 2005)
 Live in London  (Le Q, 2006)
 Bistro de Barcelona  (Refined, 2008)
 Jazz a l'Estudi  (TVC Disc, 2011)
 Avanti! (Hot Club, 2011)
 Melodium Melodynamic  (La Cupula Music, 2015)
 The Lowdown (Hot Club, 2015)

As sideman
  Jon Larsen, Short Stories from Catalonia, (Hot Club, 2013)

References 

Living people
1974 births
Spanish male guitarists
Continental jazz guitarists
Gypsy jazz guitarists
Spanish jazz guitarists
21st-century guitarists
21st-century male musicians
Male jazz musicians